Allmyapps was an application store for Microsoft Windows. The service allowed users to install, update and organize over 1,500 PC applications.

History 
Allmyapps developed an application manager for Ubuntu before entering Microsoft's IDEEs program and receiving 1 million euro from Elaia Partners in 2010. The company launched the first Windows application store as a beta version at LeWeb in December 2010, for which it won the Startup Pitch competition.

In December 2011, Allmyapps announced that they had 2.5 million registered users.

On October 21, 2014, Allmyapps was bought by ironSource.

Features 
Allmyapps supported the Windows 8, Windows 7, Windows Vista and Windows XP operating systems.

The service letted users initiate the installation of applications from its website and from its desktop client. The desktop client could detect software already installed on the computer in order to update them via the application store and to save the list online as a backup.

References

External links 
 Allmyapps App Store for Windows 
 Allmyapps for Linux

Freeware
Software distribution platforms
2010 software